SAP NetWeaver Identity Management is the Identity Management software suite SAP SE acquired in 2007 from MaXware. The latest release of the software is version 8.0, with Service Pack 5 having been released in July, 2017.

SAP NetWeaver Identity Management is a tool used to manage the full identity life cycle of users - from joining an organization to moving across positions inside the organization. It manages user access, provides user access according to current business roles, and manages passwords with self-service capabilities and approval workflows. Also, when a user is leaving the organization, it automatically deprovisions user access rights. Normally, life cycle changes come through integration with SAP Human Capital Management or SAP SuccessFactors.

SAP Identity Management integrates with SAP Access Control to check for compliance issues, risk analysis, and risk mitigation connected with role assignments, as well as possible segregation-of-duties conflicts.

References

External links
 SAP NetWeaver Identity Management 7.2 Documentation
 SAP NetWeaver Identity Management (SAP IdM)

Identity management systems